The 2019 UTSA Roadrunners football team represented the University of Texas at San Antonio during the 2019 NCAA Division I FBS football season. The Roadrunners played their home games at the Alamodome in San Antonio, Texas and competed in the West Division of Conference USA (CUSA). They were led by fourth-year head coach Frank Wilson.

Preseason

Award watch lists
Listed in the order that they were released.

CUSA media poll
Conference USA released their preseason media poll on July 16, 2019, with the Roadrunners predicted to finish in fifth place in the West Division.

Preseason All-Conference USA teams
2019 Preseason All-Conference USA

Schedule
UTSA announced its 2019 football schedule on January 10, 2019. The 2019 schedule consists of 6 home and 6 away games in the regular season.

Schedule Source:

Game summaries

Incarnate Word

at Baylor

Army

at North Texas

at UTEP

UAB

Rice

at Texas A&M

at Old Dominion

Southern Miss

Florida Atlantic

at Louisiana Tech

References

UTSA
UTSA Roadrunners football seasons
UTSA Roadrunners football